Maureen Anne Chitty (née Barton; born 14 December 1947) is a female British former Olympic long jumper.

Athletics career
Born in Kingston upon Thames, she competed in the 1968 Mexico Olympics where she reached the final and placed 12th and the 1972 Munich Olympics, where she was placed 16th. She represented England in the long jump event, at the 1974 British Commonwealth Games in Christchurch, New Zealand.

References 

 Sports Reference
 Surrey Athletics

Living people
1947 births
Athletes from London
People from Kingston upon Thames
British female long jumpers
English female long jumpers
Olympic athletes of Great Britain
Athletes (track and field) at the 1968 Summer Olympics
Athletes (track and field) at the 1972 Summer Olympics
Commonwealth Games competitors for England
Athletes (track and field) at the 1974 British Commonwealth Games